Southport is a seaside town in the Metropolitan Borough of Sefton in Merseyside, England. At the 2001 census, it had a population of 90,336, making it the eleventh most populous settlement in North West England.

Southport lies on the Irish Sea coast and is fringed to the north by the Ribble estuary.

Within the boundaries of the historic county of Lancashire, the town was founded in 1792 when William Sutton, an innkeeper from Churchtown, built a bathing house at what is now the south end of Lord Street. At that time, the area, known as South Hawes, was sparsely populated and dominated by sand dunes. At the turn of the 19th century, the area became popular with tourists due to the easy access from the nearby Leeds and Liverpool Canal. The rapid growth of Southport largely coincided with the Industrial Revolution and the Victorian era. Town attractions include Southport Pier, the second longest seaside pleasure pier in the British Isles, and Lord Street, an elegant tree-lined shopping street.

Extensive sand dunes stretch for several miles from Woodvale to Birkdale, the south of the town. The Ainsdale sand dunes have been designated as a national nature reserve and a Ramsar site. Local fauna include the natterjack toad and the sand lizard. The town contains examples of Victorian architecture and town planning, on Lord Street and elsewhere. A particular feature of the town is the extensive tree planting. This was one of the conditions required by the Hesketh family when they made land available for development in the 19th century. Hesketh Park at the northern end of the town is named after them, having been built on land donated by Rev. Charles Hesketh.

Southport today is still one of the most popular seaside resorts in the UK. It hosts various events, including an annual air show on and over the beach, the largest independent flower show in the UK (in Victoria Park) and the British Musical Fireworks Championship. The town is at the centre of England's Golf Coast and has hosted the Open Championship at the Royal Birkdale Golf Club.

History

Earliest settlements
There have been settlements in the area now comprising Southport since the Domesday Book, and some parts of the town have names of Viking origin.
The earliest recorded human activity in the region was during the Middle Stone Age, when mesolithic hunter gatherers were attracted by the abundant red deer and elk population, as well as the availability of fish, shellfish and woodland.

Roman coins have been found at Halsall Moss and Crossens, although the Romans never settled southwest Lancashire.

The first real evidence of an early settlement here is in the Domesday Book, in which the area is called Otergimele. The Domesday Book states that there were 50 huts in Otergimele, housing a population of 200. The population was scattered thinly across the region and it was at the northeast end of Otergimele (present day Crossens), where blown sand gave way to alluvial deposits from the River Ribble estuary, that a small concentration of people occurred.

It was here, it seems, that a primitive church was built, which gave the emerging village its name of Churchtown, the parish being North Meols (pronounced "meals", not "mells"). A church called St Cuthbert's is still at the centre of Churchtown.

With a booming fishing industry, the area grew slowly and hamlets became part of the parish of North Meols. From south to north, these villages were South Hawes, Haweside, Little London, Higher Blowick, Lower Blowick, Rowe-Lane, Churchtown, Marshside, Crossens, and Banks. As well as Churchtown, there were vicarages in Crossens and Banks.

Parts of the parish were almost completely surrounded by water until 1692 when Thomas Fleetwood of Bank Hall cut a channel to drain Martin Mere to the sea. From this point on, attempts at large-scale drainage of Martin Mere and other marshland continued until the 19th century, since when the water has been pumped away. This left behind a legacy of fine agricultural soil and created a booming farming industry.

Early history

In the late 18th century, it was becoming fashionable for the well-to-do to desert inland spa towns and visit the seaside to bathe in the salt sea waters. At that time, doctors recommended bathing in the sea to help cure aches and pains. In 1792, William Sutton, the landlord of the Black Bull Inn in Churchtown (now the Hesketh Arms) and known to locals as "The Old Duke", realised the importance of the newly created canal systems across the UK and set up a bathing house in the virtually uninhabited dunes at South Hawes by the seaside just four miles (6 km) away from the newly constructed Leeds and Liverpool Canal and two miles southwest of Churchtown.

When a widow from Wigan built a cottage nearby in 1797 for seasonal lodgers, Sutton quickly built a new inn on the site of the bathing house which he called the South Port Hotel, moving to live there the following season. The locals thought him mad and referred to the building as the Duke's Folly, but Sutton arranged transport links from the canal that ran through Scarisbrick, four miles from the hotel, and trade was remarkably good. The hotel survived until 1854, when it was demolished to make way for traffic at the end of Lord Street, but its presence and the impact of its founder are marked by a plaque in the vicinity, by the name of one street at the intersection, namely Duke Street, and by a hotel on Duke Street which bears the legacy name of Dukes Folly Hotel.

19th century

Southport grew quickly in the 19th century as it gained a reputation for being a more refined seaside resort than its neighbour-up-the-coast Blackpool. In fact Southport had a head start compared to all the other places on the Lancashire coast because it had easy access to the canal system. Other seaside bathing areas could not really get going until the railways were built some years later. The Leeds and Liverpool canal brought people from Liverpool, Manchester, Bolton and Wigan amongst others. By 1820 Southport had over 20,000 visitors per year.

Southport Pier is referred to as the first true "pleasure pier", being one of the earliest pier structures to be erected using iron. A design from James Brunlees was approved at a cost of £8,700 and on 4 August 1859 a large crowd witnessed the driving home of the first support pile. The opening of the pier was celebrated on 2 August 1860.

On the night of 9 December 1886, the worst lifeboat disaster in the history of the UK occurred off the shores of Southport. A cargo ship called the Mexico was on its way to South America when it found itself in difficulty. Lifeboats from Lytham, St. Annes and Southport set off to try to rescue those aboard the vessel. The crews battled against storm-force winds as they rowed towards the casualty. The entire crew from the St. Anne's boat was lost and all but two of the Southport crew were too. In all, 28 lifeboatmen lost their lives on that night, leaving many widows and fatherless children.

A memorial was erected in Duke Street Cemetery and there is a permanent display in the museum at The Atkinson on Lord Street. There is also a memorial inside the Lifeboat house, now operated by the Southport Offshore Rescue Trust. Mexico was just one of many shipwrecks in the Southport area.

20th century
From 1894 to 1912 Birkdale and the adjoining village of Ainsdale were separate from Southport and administered by Birkdale Urban District Council before becoming part of the county borough of Southport in 1912. This was a huge expansion of the town.

In 1914, a very short romance story between a “2 park road Southport" private soldier and French lady took place in Valenciennes in north France during early First World War as described by Andrée Ducatez's Journal.

In 1925, the RNLI abandoned the station at Southport and left the town with no lifeboat. In the late 1980s, after a series of tragedies, local families from Southport started to raise funds and bought a new lifeboat for the town stationed at the old RNLI lifeboat house. The lifeboat, operated by the Southport Offshore Rescue Trust, is completely independent from the RNLI and receives no money from them. Instead it relies entirely on donations from the general public.

This record lasted for just over a month, until broken by J.G. Parry-Thomas.

Governance

Politically, the constituency of Southport has historically been a key battleground between the Conservatives and Liberal Democrats, but Labour has emerged as a serious contender in recent years. John Pugh was the MP for Southport, holding the seat for 16 years until his retirement in the 2017 General election when the Conservatives took the seat and the Liberal Democrats' candidate Sue McGuire fell into third place. The incumbent Member of Parliament is Damien Moore who held a majority of 4,147 in 2019.

Lancashire
Southport is located within the historic county boundaries of Lancashire, and was incorporated as a municipal borough in 1866. It became a county borough independent of the administrative county of Lancashire in 1905, having reached the minimum 50,000 population (the 1911 census gave a figure of 51,643). The Birkdale Urban District, including the parishes of Birkdale and Ainsdale was added to Southport in 1912. The county borough had its headquarters at Southport Town Hall.

Merseyside
Under the 1971 Local Government White Paper, presented in February 1971, Southport would have lost its county borough status, becoming a non-metropolitan district within Lancashire. Rather than accept this fate and lose its separate education and social services departments, Southport Corporation lobbied for inclusion in the nearby planned metropolitan county of Merseyside, to join with Bootle and other units to form a district with the 250,000 required population. It was duly included in the Metropolitan Borough of Sefton.

This decision has been regretted by some of the population. A recurring local political issue has been the cross-party movement campaigning for Southport to leave Sefton and form its own unitary authority, perhaps adjoined to the neighbouring West Lancashire authority.  Support for this has been seen amongst Liberal Democrat councillors, and also within the Southport Conservative Party.

A Southport born man Kevin Laroux Wood stood in the 1983 general election for the Southport Constituency. He was supported by a team of like minded people who raised the funds needed and formed the "Southport Back in Lancashire Party". Posters were distributed and articles published in the Visiter newspaper. Although he was not elected as MP, it put the issue firmly on the local agenda which continues to this day. In the same period in 1980, a Private Member's Bill proposed restoring Southport to Lancashire, and renaming the residue of Sefton to the Metropolitan Borough of Bootle. The Local Government Boundary Commission for England conducted a review of the area in 1987, which attracted 10,000 messages, of which "70% were pro forma". In 1990 the LGBC made suggestions that Southport, Ainsdale and Birkdale should be made a district of Lancashire: the final recommendations in 1991 "concluded that public opinion was more evenly divided than initially thought", and also that eastward transport links with Lancashire were poor compared to those southward to the Liverpool area.

Sefton
The government again directed the Local Government Commission for England to make a review in December 1996 (after it had finished the work on the creation of unitary authorities), commencing in January 1997. This review was constrained by the legal inability of the commission to recommend that the current Sefton-West Lancashire border be altered. In a MORI poll conducted at the behest of the LGCE, 65% of Southport residents supported the campaign, compared to 37% in the borough as a whole. Local MPs Matthew Banks and Ronnie Fearn (MPs for Southport at various times) supported making Southport a unitary authority, with Banks wishing to see it tied to Lancashire ceremonially, but Fearn wishing to see it remain, as a separate borough, in Merseyside.

The commission noted that Southport would have a relatively low population for a unitary authority, even including Formby (89,300 or 114,700), and that it was worried about the viability of a south Sefton authority without Southport, and therefore recommended the status quo be kept. The commission suggested the use of area committees for the various parts of the borough and also that Southport could become a civil parish. Another request made in 2004 was turned down, the Electoral Commission must request such a review.

In 2002, a local independent party calling themselves the Southport Party was established, with many members supporting a policy of "Southport out of Sefton."  Three council seats were won in the 2002 local elections, including that of the leader of Sefton Council, Liberal Democrat Councillor, David Bamber.  At the following election there were no gains and a drop in the number of votes for the party. At the all out election in 2004, one of their councillors stood down, whilst the other two lost their seats.

To date, there have been no further moves to change Sefton's boundaries, but the Boundary Commission indicated in 2004 that a future review is possible.

Geography

Existing on the West Lancashire Coastal Plain, most of the town is only slightly above sea level and thus parts of Southport used to be susceptible to flooding. This would be most frequently noticed on Southport's Marine Drive, which was regularly closed due to flooding from high tides. But in February 1997, new sea defences started being constructed and in 2002 the whole project was completed.

Southport has a maritime climate like most of the UK. Due to its position by the coast, Southport rarely sees substantial snowfall and temperatures rarely fall below  so it does not have frequent frosts. Southport generally has moderate precipitation, unlike the rest of western UK.

The coast-to-coast Trans Pennine Trail (TPT) stretches the breadth of northern England – 215 miles (345 km) from Southport in the west to Hornsea in the east. The TPT is an exciting route for walkers, cyclists and horse riders linking the North and Irish seas and passing through the Pennines. It runs alongside rivers and canals and through some of the most historic towns and cities in the North of England. One can follow historic railways and canals and follow in the footsteps of packhorse traders on ancient salt routes.

Demography
The United Kingdom Census 2001 showed a total resident population for Southport of 90,336. Approximately 19,000 were aged 16 or under, 60,000 were aged 16–74, and 10,000 aged 75 and over. According to the 2001 census, 96% of Southport's population claim they have been born in the UK.

Historically the population of Southport began to rapidly increase during the Industrial Revolution and the Victorian era. From then the population has been stable with minor decline in some areas of the town.

People from Southport are known as "Sandgrounders", although there is debate about what is sufficient to qualify for that name.

Economy

Tourism

As a seaside town Southport has a long history of leisure and recreation and is still heavily dependent on tourism. The town went into decline when cheap air travel arrived in the 1960s and people chose to holiday abroad due to competitive prices and more reliable weather. However, the town kept afloat with people coming to spend the day by the seaside on bank holidays and weekends. The town has diversified with annual events, shopping and conferences. In 2011, Southport was named the fourteenth-most popular coastal resort in the country, benefiting from a 23% rise in money spent in the resort in that year. Part of the resort's progress is a result of the money invested in Southport over recent years.

Annual events

 Southport Airshow, the north west's biggest airshow, held in the summer
 Southport Flower Show, the UK's largest independent flower show
 British Musical Fireworks Championships
 Woodvale Rally 
 Scooter Rally at Pontins Southport
 Southport International Jazz Festival
 Southport Food and Drink Festival
 Southport Weekender
 Southport Rocks
 Southport 24 Hour Race, A sailing race that sees boats racing continuously for 24 hours even in extreme weather conditions. Entries have included Olympic gold medallists and teams from the Republic of Ireland and France, and even the US and Australia. It is regarded as one of the hardest endurance races in the world.
 Tidy Boys IDEAL Weekender

Business
While Southport has a dependence on tourism the town is also home to many businesses both in the private and public sector. Some manufacturing facilities were situated in the town, most notably Chewits were manufactured in the town from 1965 to 2006, only closing to move production to Slovakia. Manufacturing has diminished in the last few decades and only a few sites are still in production in the town today.

Lord Street is the main shopping street of Southport. It is one of the great shopping streets of Northern England and is said to be the inspiration for the tree-lined boulevards of Paris. In the 2000s Chapel Street was pedestrianised and is home to some of the UK's most famous brands. Southport also has a newly renovated indoor market situated on King Street and Market Street as well as a farmers' market held on the last Thursday of every month on Chapel Street.

Southport has a long history of hosting conferences dating back to at least the 1880s when the Royal Institution met in the town. The former Southport Theatre & Convention Centre closed in 2020 and a planning permission application for a new Marine Lake Events Centre was submitted at the end of June 2022. It has hosted the United Kingdom Independence Party national conference as well as the regional Labour Party conference. The Liberal Democrats held their federal Spring conference here in March 2018.

England's Golf Coast
Southport is often called England's Golfing Capital because it is at the centre of England's Golf Coast and has the UK's highest concentration of championship links courses. Royal Birkdale Golf Club is one of the clubs in the Open Championship rotation for both men and women. The club has hosted the men's championship ten times since 1954, most recently in July 2017, and has hosted the women's tournament five times, including 2010. Southport's other courses include the 9-hole Southport Old Links in High Park, the Hesketh Golf Club, Hillside Golf Club and Southport and Ainsdale Golf Club.

Attractions

One of Southport's main attractions for many years was Pleasureland, a fairground established in 1912. It was owned by the Thompson Family, and was closed in September 2006. A replacement fairground on the same site, provisionally named New Pleasureland, opened in July 2007. An earlier permanent funfair, Peter Pan's Playground, closed in the 1980s and is now the site of part of the Ocean Plaza shopping development.

A former landmark of Pleasureland was the Looping Star roller coaster, which was on site from 1985 to 1987. It featured in the video for the pop single Wonderful Life, by Liverpool band Black, which was also shot at other parts of the Sefton and North West coastline. On 24 April 2009 a serious fire occurred at the oldest attraction within New Pleasureland. Called The River Caves, it was completely destroyed in this arson attack, and a 16-year-old boy was arrested in connection with the fire.

Southport Model Railway Village is situated in Kings Gardens opposite the Royal Clifton Hotel and near the Marine Lake Bridge. The Model Railway Village opened in May 1996 and was created by Ray and Jean Jones. The Jones family still run the attraction today. The Model Railway Village season extends from April to the end of October. The season has extended into weekend openings during November, February and March, weather permitting. An earlier model village, the Land of the Little People, was demolished in the late 1980s to make way for the aborted Winter Gardens/SIBEC shopping development. Its site is now occupied by a Morrison's supermarket.

Other major attractions in Southport include Splash World, an indoor water park situated on the back of the Dunes swimming pool which opened in June 2007.

Meols Hall, a manor house, home of the Hesketh family, is open to the public for a limited period each year. Set in its own expansive grounds, it boasts a history back to the Domesday Book and is full of interesting pictures and furniture.

Southport also boasts the only lawnmower museum in the UK. The British Lawnmower Museum is based in Shakespeare Street, a short distance outside the town centre.

The Power Station, that was the base of the town's former radio station Dune FM, on the edge of Victoria Park, which itself is home to the Southport Flower Show.

Architecture
See also Listed buildings in Southport

Southport has many unique buildings and features, many of which are privately owned Victorian villas and houses and the town centre shops are of architectural interest. The most notable buildings, gardens and places of architectural interest are:

 Lakeside Miniature Railway
 Southport Pier, formerly home of the Southport Pier Tramway
 Marine Way Bridge
 Lord Street
 Southport Model Railway Village
 Southport Town Gardens
 Kings Gardens
 Wellington Terrace, Lord Street
 Promenade Hospital, renovated as luxury flats and renamed Marine Gate Mansions
 Ribble Building, built as a railway station then adapted for use as a bus station, part of the site was redeveloped as a supermarket and the remainder converted to a hotel and 24hr gym
 Scarisbrick Hotel
 Smedley Hydro (A former Victorian Hydropathic Health Spa, now under ownership of the Home Office for the UK's Birth, Deaths and Marriages)
 Botanic Gardens
 Hesketh Park
 Park Crescent, Hesketh Park No.29 has one of the oldest existing residential garages in the UK dating from about 1899, although both house and garage have been converted to flats. 
 Rosefield Hall on Hesketh Road, built 1908, former home of Maurice de Forest and used as a hospital during World War II
 Kew Gardens (Southport District General Hospital now occupies most of the site)
 Meols Hall
 Round House
 Wayfarers Arcade
 The Atkinson
 Southport Town Hall
 St Cuthbert's Church
 St George's United Reformed Church, Lord Street

 Emmanuel Parish Church, Cambridge Road, which has an organ, installed in 1914, built by Harrisons of Durham
 Holy Trinity Church, founded before 1898
Queen Victoria Statue – originally moved from the Town Hall Gardens to Nevill Street junction to the Promenade and again to the pedestrianised side of Nevill Street. 

Also of architectural interest, but not extant, are:
 Cannon Cinema (Lord Street) (demolished and replaced with the Vincent Hotel that opened in 2008)
Kingsway Night Club (demolished in 2010 following an arson attack)
 Open Air Baths (demolished 1990s, South Ocean Plaza complex now occupies the site)
 Steamport Museum (housed inside the former 27C locomotive shed, demolished in late 2000) site now occupied by Central 12 shopping complex.
 Palace Hotel, Birkdale (a large Victorian hotel, demolished in 1969)
 Southport General Infirmary (demolished in 2008–09 with only a wing of the infirmary remaining as it is being used for mental health services)

Transport

Road
Southport is the second-largest town in Britain with no direct dual-carriageway link to the national motorway network (after Eastbourne: 2011 census). Due to its position by the coast, Southport is a linear settlement and as such can only be approached in a limited number of directions by road.

The main roads entering Southport are:
 A565 (from Preston to the northeast, from the A59 Liverpool – Preston – York)
 A570 (from Ormskirk and St Helens to the southeast)
 A565 (from Liverpool and Formby to the south)

The nearest motorway connections are:
from the east – junction 3 of the M58 (on the A570, twelve miles)
from the south – junction 7 of the M57 (on the A565, fourteen miles)
from the north – junction 1 of the M65 /  junction 29 of the M6 (on the A582/A59, nineteen miles)

An east-west bypass for the A570 at Ormskirk is planned to relieve congestion on Southport's main access route to the motorway network, although the effectiveness of the proposals are still under debate.

Several areas within Southport town centre have recently undergone major road redevelopment; the largest scheme was the construction of the Marine Way Bridge (opened May 2004), which connects the Lord Street shopping district with the new seafront developments.

Also one of the main shopping areas in the town, Chapel Street, has undergone a pedestrianisation scheme to be similar to parts of Liverpool city centre.

Bus
Due to the limited number of directions by road, many of the services operated in Southport are from one place south to one place north or east of Southport.

The main operator is Arriva North West, that operates two (previously four) services to Liverpool, and two to Wigan and Skelmersdale via Ormskirk, Scarisbrick and Pinfold/Burscough. Arriva also operate three regular, local services, as well as a twice a day variation of service 46 (46B), six circular services around Formby, and used to operate one seasonal service (serving Pontins to the south of the town).

There are three Park and Ride facilities - one of which is operated regularly, by Arriva, one by Cumfybus and one completely disused.

Stagecoach Merseyside & South Lancashire (Preston Depot) operates four services in Southport, the 2 (Preston - Southport), the X2 (Preston – Southport - Liverpool), the 347 (Chorley - Rufford - Southport), and the 315 (Ormskirk - Southport)

Cumfybus operate three regular, local services and one dedicated Park and Ride route.

Rail

Southport railway station has a frequent service of trains to Liverpool, operated by Merseyrail and a regular service to Wigan, Bolton, Manchester and Leeds.

The Liverpool line was originally built by the Liverpool, Crosby and Southport Railway in 1848, to a terminus at Eastbank Street.

Formerly, Southport was also served by three further railway lines:

 From 1882, the West Lancashire Railway operated from Southport Derby Road station (also known as Southport Central) to Preston Fishergate Hill. This line was shut in 1964, and nowadays, Southport and Preston are linked only by the (largely dual-carriageway) A565 and A59 roads.
 In 1884, another line from Southport to Liverpool was opened: the Cheshire Lines Committee's Southport & Cheshire Lines Extension Railway extended the CLC's North Liverpool Extension Line from Liverpool Central to Southport Lord Street.
 The West Lancashire Railway sponsored the Liverpool, Southport and Preston Junction Railway to provide a connection to the CLC line, joining it at Altcar and Hillhouse. It had stations in Southport at Butts Lane and Kew Gardens. These lines ultimately proved uncompetitive, and the Southport services were withdrawn in 1952.

In July 1897, both the West Lancashire and the Liverpool, Southport and Preston Junction Railways were absorbed into the Lancashire and Yorkshire Railway (L&Y). The L&Y had a large terminus at Southport Chapel Street and could see no sense in operating two termini at very close proximity. In 1901, the L&Y completed a remodelling of the approach lines to Central to allow trains to divert onto the Manchester to Southport line and into Southport Chapel Street Station. Southport Central was closed to passengers and it became a goods depot eventually amalgamating with Chapel Street depot. It survived intact well into the 1970s.

This closed in 2016 because of the effect on the pier of the weight of the trams.

The Lakeside Miniature Railway passes under the pier, carrying passengers along the western side of the marine lake. The line claims to be the oldest continuously running  gauge railway in the world.

Education
There are several schools in the town. The all-girls Greenbank High School is situated next to the Royal Birkdale Golf Club, and is a certified Specialist Language school. Actress Miranda Richardson was educated at the school. The male equivalent (also situated in Birkdale) is the all-boys Birkdale High School, which specialises in mathematics.

Meols Cop High School is situated in the Blowick area of Southport and is one of the six schools in the country written about in OfSTED's School Inspections handbook of 2012. Meols Cop High School has recently become one of the highest achieving schools in Sefton, with 96% of the students obtaining at least 5 GCSEs at A*-C grades. The school is oversubscribed and, in February 2016, underwent building work to expand for the increasing number of students. It is a specialist school in sports.

There are several other high schools in the town, including Stanley High School, which is a specialist sports school (whose former students include comedian Lee Mack and chef Marcus Wareing), and Christ the King High School.

Independent schools
The town's last remaining independent preparatory school, Sunnymede School, which was in Westcliffe Road, Birkdale closed in 2010 due to a lack of pupils. In the past the town had more independent schools which included Tower Dene, which was situated on Cambridge Road. This school closed in 2002 due to a similar fate. One of the Victorian houses that housed the school has since been turned into apartments, the other is now a nursery. Kingswood College (originally St Wyburn's) is now housed outside Southport at Scarisbrick Hall, but it takes many pupils from the town. Brighthelmston School (girls) and University School (boys) are long closed.

Further education
The town has two further education colleges: Southport College, situated near to the town centre, and King George V College (KGV), located on Scarisbrick New Road in the Blowick area of the town.

Courses at Southport College include Diplomas, NVQs, BTECs and Access courses. In addition, Southport College offers some higher education courses in conjunction with the University of Central Lancashire, Edge Hill University and Liverpool John Moores University.

King George V College offers both A-Level and Business And Technology Education Council (BTEC). It originally opened as King George V Sixth Form College in 1979, and replaced the former King George V Grammar School for Boys, which occupied the same site from 1926 until its demolition in stages during the 1980s as the college was fully opened. In 2013, the college was the best performing state-funded college in an 18-mile radius of KGV. However, by 2015 Ofsted reported that it 'Requires improvement'. In 2016, Ofsted again rated it poorly, and a government report suggesting merging it with nearby Southport College. In the wake of the report, the college's principal left. The number of pupils at the college had plummeted from 1,530 in 2012 to just 652 in 2016. The college has somewhat recovered since then, with more positive results and a higher intake.

Media

Newspapers
The town's media consists of two rival newspaper groups, and two radio stations. The independently owned Champion newspaper is a free weekly paper, while The Mid-week Visiter and The Southport Visiter  (part of Reach plc's Sefton & West Lancs Media Mix titles) are free and paid-for newspapers respectively. The town also falls within the circulation areas of three regional hard copy newspapers; The Liverpool Echo, The Liverpool Daily Post and The Lancashire Evening Post. Southport is also covered by several local and regional magazines, like Lancashire Life. The local Ranger Service, which is part of Sefton MBC, runs a quarterly free magazine called Coastlines.

Old Southport newspapers now out of print are as follows: Independent 1861–1920s; Liverpool & Southport News 1861–1872; Southport News (West Lancs) 1881–1885; Southport Standard 1885–1899; Southport Guardian 1882–1953; Southport Journal 1904–1932; Southport Star; and Southport Advertiser.

The area also has many online media sites, including the UK's first online newspaper, the Southport Reporter, as well as Internet forums and blog sites.

Broadcasting
The town's commercial radio station Dune FM closed during August 2012. Coast 107.9 was since launched and continued to broadcast online. Southport is covered by several local and regional radio stations, including Sandgrounder Radio, Radio City, Rock FM, Greatest Hits Radio Liverpool & The North West, Greatest Hits Radio Lancashire and BBC Radio Merseyside.

Mighty Radio is Southport’s only local community FM radio station. Established in 2012 after the towns former station closed, local presenters set up a new station online. Mighty Radio was given a trial RSL in 2012. December 2018, OFCOM  awarded Mighty Radio with their FM license. Mighty have thrived within their community. Showcasing local talent through their presenters, they provide the town with local up to date news from Radio News Hub hourly from 0700-1900 7 days a week with local headlines ‘as and when’ they come in. Mighty Radio are renowned for and are committed to supporting local and national charities. Mighty Radio may be found on 107.9 fm and online at www.mightyradio.co.uk

Southport is situated within the television regions of BBC North West and ITV's Granada Television.

Café Royal Books 
Based in Southport and established in 2005 by Craig Atkinson. Café Royal Books is a publisher of documentary photography, producing weekly publications and creating a print archive of cultural, community, street & social change from Britain, Ireland & beyond.

Sports

Football

Southport is home to Southport F.C. who have played at the Haig Avenue, Blowick ground since 1905. The club entered The Football League in 1921 and became a founder member of the Third Division North. In 1978 the club was voted out of the Football League following three consecutive 23rd (out of 24) placed finishes, and was replaced by Wigan Athletic. Southport were the last club to leave the Football League through the re-election process. Automatic relegation from the Fourth Division was introduced in 1986–1987. They are in the National League North, the sixth tier of English football. They were previously in the National League after winning the Conference North in 2009–2010 campaign.

Rugby
Southport is also home to a rugby union club, Southport Rugby Football Club, who play their home matches at Waterloo Road in Hillside. Southport RFC's first XV currently plays in North 2 West in the Rugby Football Union Northern Division, and the club fields many sides at all age levels, Senior: First XV, Second XV, Third XV, veterans, Ladies, U18 Colts; Junior: U13s to U17 Colts; Mini: U6s to U12s. 

Originally founded as, Southport Football Club, on 29 November 1872 and is one of the oldest rugby clubs in the world. The first president of the club was Samuel Swire, the Mayor of Southport. In line with the origins of the modern game, the club was originally composed of old public school boys, and was formed with the intention of improving the physical development of our young townsmen. The driving force behind the formation of the club was Dr George Coombe (later Sir George Augustus Pilkington) of Southport Infirmary. Notable former players include, Samuel Perry, England International, Gordon Rimmer, former England International, and British Lion and *Bob Burdell, Wigan Warriors and Lancashire.

Golf
The town is probably best known for golf; the Royal Birkdale Golf Club situated in the dunes to the south of the town is one of the venues on The Open Championship rotation and has hosted two Ryder Cups. Nearby Southport and Ainsdale Golf Club is also a two time Ryder Cup venue and both Hillside Golf Club and Hesketh Golf Club host many major events as well as being final open qualifying courses. Many smaller links courses also surround the town.

Kite surfing

Southport's location by the coast also lends itself to some more specialised sporting activities – Ainsdale Beach, south of the town, is popular for kite sports, including kite-surfing.

Speed record
His association is commemorated by the name of a public house on Lord Street.

Water
Marine Lake lies nestled between the town centre and the sea and is used for a variety of water-sports including water-skiing, sailing and rowing. The lake is home to the West Lancashire Yacht Club and Southport Sailing Club, both of which organise dinghy racing. The annual Southport 24 Hour Race, organised by the West Lancashire Yacht Club, is an endurance race of national standing, with an average turnout of 60 to 80 boats. In 2006, the event marked its 40th anniversary.

Cycling
The flat and scenic route alongside the beach is very popular with cyclists, and is the start of the Trans Pennine Trail, a cycle route running across the north of the country to Selby in North Yorkshire, through Hull and on to Hornsea on the east coast.

In June 2008, Cycling England announced Southport as one of the 11 new cycling towns. These 11 towns shared £47 million from the government to be spent solely on cycling schemes in the towns. Southport's Cycling Towns programme aims to encourage tourism and leisure cycling, create regeneration opportunities and significantly increase cycling to school.
There are now many cycle lanes in Southport and more are planned, to encourage cycling in the town.

Speedway Racing
An article in the Northern Daily Telegraph for 22 September 1929 reports that a proposed meeting at Kew Speedway had been halted due to the intervention  of the Auto Cycle Union. (ACU) The proprietor of the venture was Mr Farrar. It is not known if the track was amended and if any events took place.

Notable people

 Sophie Abelson, actress
 Harold Ackroyd VC MC, recipient of the Victoria Cross in World War I
 Jean Alexander, Coronation Street and Last of the Summer Wine actress
 Marc Almond OBE, lead singer of Soft Cell
 Michael Arlen, author and playwright 
 Robin Askwith, actor
 Matthew Baylis, novelist, journalist and ex- EastEnders storyliner
 Jake Bidwell, footballer
 Brian Birch, footballer
 Gavin Blyth, journalist and ex-Emmerdale producer
 Dora Bryan OBE, actress
 Jon Burton, founder of Traveller's Tales
 Peter Clarke, footballer
 Paul Comstive, footballer 
 Philip Connard, artist, member of the Royal Academy of Arts
 Kenneth Cope, Coronation Street, Randall and Hopkirk (Deceased) and Brookside actor
 Richard Corbett, MEP
 Peter Cropper, violinist
 John Culshaw, record producer
 Kenny Dalglish (Sir Kenneth Mathieson Dalglish MBE) footballer, football manager
 Linda Davidson, ex- EastEnders actress
 Josh Earl, footballer 
 Souad Faress actress
 Lord Fearn, politician
 Tommy Fleetwood, golfer
 Paul Gardner, footballer
 Four of the five members of the Mercury Prize winning band Gomez
 Alan Groves, footballer
 Fran Halsall, swimmer
 Ollie Halsall, guitarist
 Frank Hampson, artist, creator of Dan Dare
 Alan Hansen, footballer, television pundit
 Margaret Harker, photographer, historian of photography and the UK's first woman professor of photography
 Tim Hetherington, British photojournalist and film-maker killed in Libya during the 2011 Libyan Civil War
 Martin Hodge, footballer
 Anthony Holden, writer
 Jan Holden, actress
 Tony Jordan, ex- EastEnders writer
 Michael Weston King, musician
 Låpsley, musician
 Renny Lister, actress
 David Lonsdale, actor
 Lee Mack, comedian
 Ginger McCain, racehorse trainer
 Neil McDermott, ex- EastEnders actor
 David Mitchell, author
 Eddie Mosscrop, footballer
 Anna Passey, Hollyoaks actress 
 Wilfred Pickles, actor and broadcaster
 Albert Pierrepoint, executioner (hangman)
 Ryan Prescott, Coronation Street and ex- Emmerdale and Doctors actor
 Keith Pring, footballer
 Anthony Quayle, actor
 Arthur Richardson, VC
 Miranda Richardson, actress
 Jackie Rimmer, footballer
 Jimmy Rimmer, footballer
 Michael Rimmer, 800m athlete
 Stuart Rimmer, footballer
 William Rimmer, composer and conductor
 Adele Roberts, DJ and reality star
 Jack Rodwell, footballer
 Tony Rodwell, footballer
 Graham Rowe, footballer
 G. B. Samuelson, pioneer of British cinema
 Alexei Sayle,  stand-up comedian, actor, author and former recording artist
 Kenneth Siviter, cricketer
 Lee Slattery, golfer
 Doris Speed MBE, Coronation Street actress 
 Hope Squire, composer
 Adrian Scott Stokes, painter
 Leonard Stokes, architect
 A. J. P. Taylor, historian
 Shaun Teale, footballer
 Brian Viner, journalist and author 
 Tony Waiters, footballer and coach of Canada's national team at the 1986 World Cup
 Marcus Wareing, chef
 Edmund Whittaker, mathematician

Famous animals and entities
 Red Rum, record-breaking racehorse and three-time winner of the Aintree Grand National
 Eagle, a comic for boys, started in Southport
 Ron Asheton, founder member of The Stooges. Decided on a music career after visiting The Cavern Club during a stay in Southport.

See also

 Corgi Motorcycle Co Ltd.
 Southport (UK Parliament constituency)
 Southport Corporation Tramways
Southport power station

References

Further reading

 Local Newspapers, holds newspaper title names from 1750 to 1920.

External links

 Official Southport Tourism site
 Southport Offshore Rescue Trust

 
Towns in Merseyside
Seaside resorts in England
Towns and villages in the Metropolitan Borough of Sefton
Populated coastal places in Merseyside
Beaches of Merseyside
Unparished areas in Merseyside